Joseph-Antoine Provana (17 October 1662 - 7 February 1720) was a Piedmontese Jesuit missionary to China during the era of the Kangxi Emperor and the Chinese Rites controversy. Provana converted and baptized Louis Fan, the first Chinese known to have traveled to Europe and returned to China. He served as an envoy to Pope Clement XI for the Kangxi emperor and arrived in Rome in 1719. He died on his return journey to China, but his corpse was transported to Guangzhou and buried there.

See also 
 Louis Fan

References 

1662 births
1720 deaths
Italian emigrants to China
17th-century Italian Jesuits
Italian Roman Catholic missionaries